Applesoft is a name used by Apple Inc. for:
 Applesoft BASIC, a programming language interpreter built into the Apple II computers
 the division responsible for developing the classic Mac OS from 1993 until about 1997